Bimbo is the second album released by a Polish rock band Virgin. The album has earned golden record award in Poland.

Track listing 
"Szafa - 3:55 (Closet)
"Chłopczyku Mój" - 4:06 (My boy)
"Dżaga" - 4:05 (Hot girl)
"Nie Zawiedź Mnie" - 3:12 (Don't disappoint me)
"Nie Oceniać Jej" - 4:36 (Don't judge her)
"Et Anima" - 4:34 
"Ulica" - 3:56 (Street)
"Piekarnia" - 3:15 (Bakery)
"Okno Boże" - 3:05 (God's Window)
"Teraz To Wiem" - 3:25 (Now I know it)
"Bar" - 3:31 (Pub)
"Kolejny Raz" - 3:25 (Another time )
"Mój "M"" - 2:59 (My M)

2004 albums
Virgin (band) albums